Brahetrolleborg is a castle about 10 kilometres north-west of Fåborg on the Danish  island of Fyn.

Holme Abbey

The abbey was founded and settled in 1172 from the Cistercian Herrevad Abbey in Scania, now in Sweden, of which it was a daughter house. It was secularised during the Reformation, probably in 1536.

After the abbey was secularised and taken into the possession of the Danish Crown, the Crown released it into private ownership. In 1568 it became the property of Heinrich Rantzau (1526–1598), from whom it acquired for a time the name Rantzausholm. After reverting again to the Crown in 1661, it was granted in 1664 by King Frederick III of Denmark to his court favourite, the German merchant and politician Christoffer Gabel (1617-1673) who exchanged it three years later for the chalk mountain of Segeberg with Birgitte Nielsdatter, of the Trolle family and married into the Brahe family, whence the name of the castle and also of her barony, Brahetrolleborg. The Trolles sold it in 1722 to Christian Detlev von Reventlow(1671–1738), Oberpräsident of Altona, and the estate has remained until today in the Reventlow family.

Buildings
The former Cistercian church, laid out according to the plan of Saint Bernard, is now the chapel of Brahetrolleborg. It has a tower on the west front, and possesses a crucifix by Claus Berg of about 1500. The conventual buildings, located to the right of the church, were converted after secularisation for use as a castle, which was comprehensively overhauled in about 1870.

References

Other sopurces
 Venge, Michael, 1982: På sporet af Holme kloster. Fynske Arbøger 1982, pp. 27–38

External links
Brahetrolleborg Kirke 

Cistercian monasteries in Denmark
Castles and manor houses on Funen
Listed buildings and structures in Faaborg-Midtfyn Municipality
Buildings and structures in Denmark associated with the Trolle family